is a former Nippon Professional Baseball outfielder.

External links

1977 births
Living people
People from Uwajima, Ehime
Baseball people from Ehime Prefecture
Japanese baseball players
Nippon Professional Baseball outfielders
Yakult Swallows players
Tokyo Yakult Swallows players
Tohoku Rakuten Golden Eagles players
Japanese baseball coaches
Nippon Professional Baseball coaches